Chauliognathinae is a subfamily of soldier beetles in the family Cantharidae. There are at least 4 genera and at least 20 described species in Chauliognathinae.

Genera
 Belotus Gorham, 1881
 Chauliognathus Hentz, 1830
 Ichthyurus Westwood, 1848
 Trypherus LeConte, 1851

References

 Bouchard, P., Y. Bousquet, A. Davies, M. Alonso-Zarazaga, J. Lawrence, C. Lyal, A. Newton, et al. (2011). "Family-group names in Coleoptera (Insecta)". ZooKeys, vol. 88, 1–972.
 Delkeskamp, Kurt (1977). "Cantharidae". Coleopterorum Catalogus Supplementa, pars 165, fasc. 1, 485.
 Lawrence, J. F., and A. F. Newton Jr. / Pakaluk, James, and Stanislaw Adam Slipinski, eds. (1995). "Families and subfamilies of Coleoptera (with selected genera, notes, references and data on family-group names)". Biology, Phylogeny, and Classification of Coleoptera: Papers Celebrating the 80th Birthday of Roy A. Crowson, vol. 2, 779–1006.

Further reading

 Arnett, R. H. Jr., M. C. Thomas, P. E. Skelley and J. H. Frank. (eds.). (21 June 2002). American Beetles, Volume II: Polyphaga: Scarabaeoidea through Curculionoidea. CRC Press LLC, Boca Raton, Florida .
 Arnett, Ross H. (2000). American Insects: A Handbook of the Insects of America North of Mexico. CRC Press.
 Richard E. White. (1983). Peterson Field Guides: Beetles. Houghton Mifflin Company.

External links

 NCBI Taxonomy Browser, Chauliognathinae

Cantharidae
Beetle subfamilies